John George Stewart (June 2, 1890 – May 24, 1970) was an American architect and politician from Wilmington, in New Castle County, Delaware. He was a member of the Republican Party, who served as U.S. Representative from Delaware and as Architect of the Capitol. He was known by his middle name.

Early life and family
Stewart was born in Wilmington, Delaware. He attended the public schools of Wilmington and the University of Delaware at Newark, Delaware. He worked in the landscape construction business from 1919 until 1942, during which time he was a member of the Delaware Athletic Commission from 1931 until 1934, and a commissioner on the Delaware Emergency Relief Commission in 1934.

Professional and political career
Stewart was elected to the U.S. House of Representatives in 1934, defeating Democrat John C. Hazzard. He served in the Republican minority in the 74th Congress, and lost his bid for a second term in 1936 to Democrat, William F. Allen. Stewart served from January 3, 1935 until January 3, 1937, during the first administration of U.S. President Franklin D. Roosevelt.

Ten years later he became a member of the staff of the United States Senate Committee on the District of Columbia, and served there from 1947 until 1951. He was special engineer to the lands division of the United States Department of Justice and Corps of Engineers in 1952/1953, and was a civil engineer in Hollywood, Florida in 1954. U.S. President Dwight D. Eisenhower appointed him to be Architect of the Capitol, and he served in that position from October 1, 1954 until his death.

Death and legacy
Stewart died in Washington D.C. and is buried in the Lower Brandywine Cemetery, near Centerville, Delaware.

Almanac
Elections are held the first Tuesday after November 1. U.S. Representatives take office January 3 and have a two-year term.

References

External links
Biographical Directory of the United States Congress 
Delaware and U.S. History
The Political Graveyard

1890 births
1970 deaths
People from Wilmington, Delaware
Architects from Washington, D.C.
20th-century American architects
Architects of the United States Capitol
Burials in New Castle County, Delaware
Republican Party members of the United States House of Representatives from Delaware
Architects from Delaware
20th-century American politicians